Makhdoomzada Syed Asad Murtaza Gilani (February 19, 1968 – September 24, 2015) was a Pakistani politician and parliamentarian. He was elected as a member of the National Assembly of Pakistan on a ticket of the Pakistan Peoples Party from Multan Constituency NA-152 in the 2002 Pakistani general election. Gilani was the nephew of former Prime Minister Yousuf Raza Gilani. He died in the 2015 Mina disaster which killed at least 2,262 people.

References

Pakistani MNAs 2002–2007
Pakistan People's Party politicians
People from Multan
1968 births
2015 deaths
Accidental deaths in Saudi Arabia
University of the Punjab alumni